Aaha Kalyanam is an 2023 Indian Tamil-language television series, starring Mounika Vikram Shri, Akshaya Kandamuthan, Gayathri Sri, Vibish Aswanth RG Ram and Bhavya Sree in the lead roles. The series is an official remake of Star Jalsha's popular drama Gaatchora. It is scheduled to premiere on Star Vijay on March 20, 2023 at 7:00 PM.

Plot
The story revolves around Kodeeswari (Mounika), a  mother who wishes that someday her daughters would get married into a wealthy family. But whose bond will form with whom, the decision lies in the hands of God.
On the other side, the Ramaswamis are a single family. The three brothers in the family are adored by their grandparents the most.

Cast

Main
 Vikram Shri as Surya
 Akshaya Kandamuthan as Maha
 Vibish Aswanth
 Gayatri Sri as Ishwarya
 RG Ram
 Bhavya Sree as Prabha

Recurring 
 Mounika as Koodeswari
 Anitha Venkat as Rajalakshmi

Production

Casting
The Tamil actress Mounika was cast as Kodeeswari. Gayathri Sri was cast in the female lead role as Kodeeswari's elder daughter and Akshaya Kandamuthan as second daughter by making her lead Tamil debut. Vikram Shri plays the male lead alongside her.

Release
The first promo was unveiled on 8 February 2023, featuring protagonist, we can see Kodeeswari and her three daughters are happily shopping in the store and the owner asked her about her daughter's wedding. A second promo was unveiled 13 February 2023. A third promo was launched on 8 March 2023.

The show started airing on Star Vijay on 20 March 2023 From Monday to Friday at 19:00 (IST), replacing Raja Rani 2 Time slot.

References

Star Vijay original programming
Tamil-language romance television series
2023 Tamil-language television series debuts
Tamil-language television series based on Bengali-languages television series
Tamil-language television soap operas
Television shows set in Tamil Nadu
Tamil-language television shows